United Nations Security Council Resolution 239, adopted unanimously on July 10, 1967, after reaffirming its concern over the issue and past condemnations, the Council again condemned any state which persisted in permitting or tolerating the recruitment of mercenaries or the provision of facilities to them, with the objective of overthrowing the governments of member states.  The Council called upon governments to ensure that their territory and nationals were not being used for the planning of subversion, the recruitment, training or transit of mercenaries designed to overthrow the government of the Democratic Republic of the Congo.

See also
Congo Crisis
List of United Nations Security Council Resolutions 201 to 300 (1965–1971)

References
Text of the Resolution at undocs.org

External links
 

 0239
 0239
July 1967 events